The Woodone Open Hiroshima was a professional golf tournament in Japan. Founded in 1972 as the Hiroshima Open, it was an event on the Japan Golf Tour from 1973 to 2007. Except for the 1997 tournament, which was held at Yonex Country Club in Niigata Prefecture, and the 1980 tournament, which was held at Kam Country Club in Ichihara, Chiba, it was played at Hiroshima Country Club near Higashihiroshima in Hiroshima Prefecture.

Winners

Source:

Notes

References

External links
Coverage on Japan Golf Tour's official site

Former Japan Golf Tour events
Defunct golf tournaments in Japan
Sports competitions in Hiroshima
Recurring sporting events established in 1972
Recurring sporting events disestablished in 2007